The 1910 Colorado gubernatorial election was held on November 8, 1910. Incumbent Democrat John F. Shafroth defeated Republican nominee John B. Stephen with 51.04% of the vote.

General election

Candidates
Major party candidates
John F. Shafroth, Democratic
John B. Stephen, Republican

Other candidates
Henry W. Pinkham, Socialist
Phidelah A. Rice, Prohibition
George Anderson, Socialist Labor

Results

References

1910
Colorado
Gubernatorial